Balistrad is a Haitian online newspaper founded in 2018 by Fincy Pierre. Balistrad is published in French and Haitian Creole. Balistrad is an independent media company producing content for the web. This content is available in the form of publications (texts, photos, audios and videos) on its website and on its accounts on social media and can be viewed by the entire Internet community.

Description 
Balistrad consists of two main sections: "Le Journal", run by professional journalists, and "Le Blog", a collaborative forum opened for Haitian bloggers wanting to convey their opinions and demands.

Balistrad is one of the 167 international sources of the Agora Francophone press review.

Balistrad appeared for the first time March 9, 2018.

People

Executives
 Fincy Pierre — Founder, Executive  
 Alain Délisca — Executive director  
 Vanessa Dalzon — Editor-in-chief, Executive

Current notable personalities
 Fincy Pierre — Founder  
 Vanessa Dalzon — Editor-in-chief

See also
 List of newspapers in Haiti
 Media of Haiti

References

External links
  
 Balistrad Blog 

French-language websites
French-language newspapers published in North America
French news websites
Magazines established in 2018
French-language magazines
Newspapers published in Haiti
Mass media in Haiti
Haitian Creole-language mass media
Creole-language mass media
Multilingual magazines
Haitian websites
Haitian news websites
Web